East-West Link may refer to:

 East West Link (Melbourne)
 East-West Link (Suriname)
 East-West Link, Brisbane
 East–West Link Expressway, in Malaysia
 East West Rail, in England

See also
 Eastlink (disambiguation)
 Westlink (disambiguation)